Ján Chovanec (born 22 March 1984) is a Slovak footballer who plays as a midfielder.

Club career 
He was signed by Trnava in July 2013 and made his debut for them against Senica on 13 July 2013.

References

External links
MFK Ružomberok profile 

1984 births
Living people
Slovak footballers
Association football midfielders
MŠK Púchov players
MFK Ružomberok players
FK Teplice players
FC Spartak Trnava players
Ruch Chorzów players
Spartak Myjava players
FC Nitra players
Slovak Super Liga players
Czech First League players
Ekstraklasa players
Expatriate footballers in the Czech Republic
Expatriate footballers in Poland
People from Nové Zámky
Sportspeople from the Nitra Region